Sheikh Tamim bin Hamad Al Thani (born 3 June 1980, Doha, Qatar) is the Emir of Qatar.

Tamim is the fourth son of Emir Hamad bin Khalifa. He became heir apparent in 2003 when his older brother Sheikh Jassim renounced his claim to the throne. He became emir when his father abdicated in his favor in 2013. Tamim has been involved in efforts to raise Qatar's international profile through hosting sports events such as the 2022 FIFA World Cup, as well as buying Paris Saint-Germain F.C.

Tamim was regarded by the Royal Islamic Strategic Studies Centre as the most influential Muslim in the world in 2022 and ranks third in 2023.

Early life and education
Tamim bin Hamad was born on 3 June 1980 in Doha, Qatar. He is the fourth son of Sheikh Hamad bin Khalifa Al Thani, and second son of Sheikha Moza bint Nasser Al-Missned, Hamad's second wife. Tamim was educated at Great Britain's Sherborne School (International College) in Dorset, and at Harrow School, where he sat his A-Levels in 1997. He then attended the Royal Military Academy Sandhurst, graduating in 1998.

Career
Sheikh Tamim was commissioned as a second lieutenant in the Qatar Armed Forces upon graduation from Sandhurst. He became the heir apparent to the Qatar throne on 5 August 2003, when his elder brother Sheikh Jassim renounced his claim to the title. Since then he was groomed to take over rule, working in top security and economics posts. On 5 August 2003, he was appointed deputy commander-in-chief of Qatar's armed forces.

Sheikh Tamim promoted sport as part of Qatar's bid to raise its international profile. In 2005 he founded Oryx Qatar Sports Investments, which owns Paris Saint-Germain F.C. among other investments. In 2006, he chaired the organizing committee of the 15th Asian Games in Doha. Under his leadership, all member countries attended the event for the first time in its history. That year Egypt's Al Ahram voted Tamim "the best sport personality in the Arab world". Under his guidance, Qatar won the rights to host the 2014 FINA Swimming World Championships and the 2022 FIFA World Cup. Tamim is chairman of the National Olympic Committee. At the 113th session of the International Olympic Committee (IOC) in February 2002, he was elected as a member of the IOC. He headed Doha's bid for the 2020 Olympics. The country hosted the 2022 FIFA World Cup. Qatar is estimated to have spent around $200 billion on infrastructure in preparation for the event.

The Olympic Council of Asia (OCA) Evaluation Committee completed its tour to Doha in November 2020, and confirmed that the city will have much to offer for the Asian Games, and that they were satisfied with the prioritizing and support from Tamim. At the 39th General Assembly of the OCA, President Ahmed Al-Fahad Al-Ahmed Al-Sabah announced that Doha would host the 2030 Asian Games.

Sheikh Tamim heads the Qatar Investment Authority board of directors. Under his leadership, the fund has invested billions in British businesses. It owns large stakes in Barclays Bank, Sainsbury's, and Harrods. The fund also owns a share of Europe's fourth tallest building, the Shard.

Tamim has also held a number of other posts, including:
Head of the Upper Council of the Environment and Natural Sanctuaries.
Chairman of the Supreme Council for the Environment and Natural Reserves.
Chairman of the Supreme Education Council.
Chairman of the Supreme Council of Information and Communication Technology.
Chairman of the board of directors of Public Works Authority (Ashghal) and the Urban Planning and Development Authority (UPDA).
Chairman of the board of regents of Qatar University.
Deputy chairman of the Ruling Family Council.
Vice president of the Supreme Council for Economic Affairs and Investment.
Deputy chairman of the High Committee for Coordination and Follow Up.
Member of "Sports for All".

Reign 

On 25 June 2013, Tamim's father, Sheikh Hamad bin Khalifa Al Thani, revealed his own plan to step down as the Emir of Qatar in a meeting with his close relatives and aides. Tamim then became the Emir of Qatar after his father handed over power in a televised speech. He was the first ruler, in a succession of three Qatari rulers from the Al Thani family, to ascend to power without resorting to a coup. According to The Economist, of his previous sibling rivals to the throne, "One played too much, the other prayed too much." The transition of power went smoothly, as family members hold many of the nation's top posts.

According to a diplomatic source close to the Al Thani family, Sheikh Tamim has "a strong personality" that allowed him to "establish himself within the ruling family". He became crown prince on 5 August 2003, after his brother Sheikh Jassim had stepped down. Diplomats quoted by the BBC argued that Jassim, who served as crown prince for eight years, had hoped to expand his political powers. In 2003, Sheikh Jassim stepped down from the position of crown prince. According to Qatar News Agency Jassim sent a letter to his father saying, “The time is appropriate to step down and prepare for a successor”. In the letter, Jassim stated, “I did not want, as I have told you from the start, to be appointed as crown prince”, and noted he had only accepted the position in October 1996 because of "sensitive circumstances". According to a report by Stratfor, Jassim had no allies among the military forces or secret police at the time of the 2013 political transition, and thereby few chances to overturn Hamad's decree.

Domestic policy 

Tamim rules an authoritarian regime in Qatar, as he holds all executive and legislative authority, political parties are forbidden, and elections are not free and fair. The citizens of Qatar have limited political and civil rights. There is no freedom of the press in Qatar. In February 2013, Jan Keulen (Director of the Doha Centre for Media Freedom) stated in an interview that the state implemented policies for escalating freedom and quality of information being broadcast. In 2016, Tamim's regime blocked Doha News after it had done critical reporting.

In striking contrast with his father's rule, who had prioritized Qatar's international profile, a new focus on domestic affairs has characterized Tamim's government so far. One of Tamim's first moves after coming to power was to streamline the bureaucracy by disassembling a number of parallel institutions, such as the Qatar National Food Security Program, which was incorporated into the Ministries of Economy and Agriculture. He also decreased the fiscal budget of several institutions, including Qatar Foundation and Qatar Museums Authority.

Since his accession to power, the government has expanded the roads around the capital, developed a new metro system, and completed the construction of a new airport. A new reform of the Qatari administration was launched towards increased efficiency and discipline. Moreover, the post of foreign minister has passed to a non-royal (Khalid al-Attiya). This is a significant change in the direction of meritocracy, given that during the previous administrations the prime minister, traditionally a royal, tended to double as foreign minister.
Tamim also took credit for some initiatives directed at countering local sensitivities arising from the Arab Spring upheaval. He announced that the government would establish a directive to lower the price of foodstuffs sold by companies working with the country's National Food Security Programme and anticipated social allowances and pension increases.

According to his inaugural speech to the nation held on 26 June 2013, Sheikh Tamim will continue to diversify the country's economy away from hydrocarbons.

In 2014, Tamim passed new cybercrime legislation, which was said to be part of an agreement among Gulf states to criminalize online insults of the region's royal families; The cybercrime law outlawed the spreading of "false news" as well as digital material that violates the country's "social values" or "general order". The legislation made it illegal to incite, aid and facilitate the publication of offensive material. The law was criticized as being intended by the authoritarian regime to silence dissent in Qatar. Amnesty International called the law "a major setback for freedom of expression in Qatar", while other critics suggest that the new law will violate provisions of the country's constitution that protect civil liberties.

In June 2013, Sheikh Tamim unveiled his new cabinet. Khalid bin Mohammad Al Attiyah was named foreign minister. Tamim made Hessa Al Jaber the first ever Minister of Information and Communications Technology in Qatar in 2013. She was the third female minister to be named to the cabinet.

In January 2016, Tamim made additional changes to his cabinet. He named a new foreign minister, Mohammed bin Abdulrahman bin Jassim Al Thani, moving the previous foreign minister, Khalid bin Mohammad Al Attiyah to the position of Minister of State for Defense Affairs. Tamim also merged several ministries, including communication and transport, culture, youth and sports. Journalists have speculated reasons behind the cabinet changes. Some have come to the conclusion that the reorganization was either an economic move, meant to save the country money at a time where the falling price of gas has forced the country to scale back its workforce or for reasons of political stability. Eurasia Group indicated in a report that the cabinet change aimed to increase efficiency in government operations and would not negatively impact political or economic stability. According to others the appointments showed that Tamim was trying to make the government his own by bringing in a new, younger generation of ministers that were more loyal to him than to his father. In August 2021, Tamim issued a decree to hold the first-ever legislative elections to the Consultative Assembly of Qatar which were held on 2 October 2021. Following a vote controversy at the elections, Tamim pledged equal citizenship and ordered legal amendments.

Labour reform 
Two laws protecting workers' rights, which included clauses on maximum working hours and rights to annual leave, were passed by Sheikh Tamim in 2017. The next year, Sheikh Tamim passed Law No. 13 of 2018, abolishing exit visas for roughly 95% of the country's migrant workers. The remaining 5% of workers, which amount to approximately 174,000 people, still require their employer's permission to exit the country. While stating that more needs to be done to protect the rights of Qatar's workers, at the same time Stephen Cockburn of Amnesty claimed that the Emir had taken an "important first step towards meeting the authorities' promise to fundamentally reform the exploitative sponsorship system".

In November 2017, Qatar and the International Labour Organization started a technical cooperation programme to improve working conditions and labour rights.
The ILO opened its first project office in Qatar on 30 April 2018 to support the implementation of the programme.

Following the adoption on 30 August 2020 of Law No. 19 of 2020, migrant workers can now change jobs before the end of their contract without first having to obtain a No Objection Certificate (NOC) from their employer. This new law, coupled with the removal of exit permit requirements earlier in the year, effectively dismantles the “kafala” sponsorship system and marks the beginning of a new era for the Qatari labour market.

In March 2021, Qatar additionally implemented a monthly minimum wage of 1,000 riyals (USD 275) for all workers, making it the first country in the region to do so.

Legislative election 
On 29 July 2021, Sheikh Tamim signed Law No. 6 of 2021 for the conduct of first legislative (Shura Council) election in Qatar and fifth in the Gulf cooperation Council (GCC). The law was first approved in a 2003 constitutional referendum but was never enforced. Of the 45 seats of the Shura Council, two-third (30 seats) is elected while the Emir appoints the remaining 15 members of the council giving this minority group and his cabinet overwhelming power of decision making on issues of defense, foreign policy and other critical issues of the state. The elected Shura Council members are vested with powers to draft laws, approves state budgets, debates major issues and provides advice to the ruling emir. This law was widely criticized by international rights groups for the exclusion of naturalized Qatari citizens and other groups. On 2 October 2021, first ever election held in Qatar recording 63.5 per cent voter turnout but with protests by disenfranchised groups. Qatari officials tagged the election “experiment”

Foreign policy 

The young Emir's transition to power was welcomed by leaders across the world, who expected Tamim to continue the good work in the footsteps of his father and increase Qatar's role in vital international affairs, including the Syrian crisis and Darfur agreement.

Analysts said he would be tasked with overseeing substantial upgrades to the national infrastructure, which have recently gotten underway. While some view Tamim as more religious than his father, most analysts expect him to retain his father's largely pragmatic habits of governing – using Islam to further objectives where useful, but not pushing strictly Islamic agenda items such as outlawing alcohol. Under his leadership, Qatar has condemned hate speech based on religion, belief and race.

In his inaugural speech to the nation, Tamim vowed that he would continue to pursue a central role for Qatar in the region but that he will not "take direction" in foreign affairs. He confirmed that he will commit to the highest possible level of integration with his Gulf neighbors.

In fact, during his first months in charge he has prioritized the Gulf. In late October 2013, only a few months after taking charge, Sheikh Tamim took a regional tour of the Gulf. Even before his accession to power, he formally represented his father at the annual Gulf Cooperation Council (GCC) Summit in Bahrain in December 2012 as well as in welcoming delegates to the Arab League Summit in Doha in March 2013.

Working in a government security post, he promoted stronger ties with Saudi Arabia, a neighbour and often contentious rival to Qatar. Tamim considers Qatar's rivalry with Saudi Arabia unproductive, as has been the case in the so far unsuccessful attempt to build a cohesive Syrian opposition. Despite this, Tamim worked within the GCC to support the Syrian opposition.

The country's support for Islamist causes and for organizations that oppose the absolute rule of the Gulf's hereditary rulers provoked tensions with the GCC countries. In March 2014 Saudi Arabia, Bahrain and United Arab Emirates withdrew their ambassadors from Qatar. Officially, the decision was motivated by Qatar's alleged refusal to ratify the agreements of non-interference in domestic policy within the GCC in December 2013. Some analysts observed that the diplomatic crisis was the peak of long-time degenerated relationships of Qatar with the Arab countries, who have rebuked Qatar for allegedly backing Islamists during Arab Spring revolts and are supportive of the new military-oriented Egyptian regime.

Qatar has also provided aid through loans and investments to the democratically elected Ennahdha Party in Tunisia, and to parties in Yemen and Morocco.

During 2014-2017, Qatar appeared to be in compliance with counter terrorism and demolishment of its support to Islamist rebels groups as a result the nation agreed to stop providing support to the Muslim Brotherhood, expelled non-citizen Brothers from its territory and would not shelter any persons from GCC countries to avoid undermining relations with the Gulf.

There have been no terrorist incidents reported in Qatar since 2014. In 2019, the Qatari
government finalized new counter-terrorism legislation that enhanced penalties for committing acts of terror and enabled the prosecution of Qataris who commit acts of terror. Both laws went into effect in February 2020. The US State Department’s report in April 2022 stated that Qatar uses national funds to pay for participation of Qatari personnel in the Department of State’s Anti-Terrorism Assistance (ATA) training program, including training pertinent to Qatar’s preparations to host the FIFA World Cup in 2022.

In January 2021, the Emir signed an agreement ending the 43-month air, land and sea blockade of Qatar by Saudi Arabia, the United Arab Emirates, Bahrain and Egypt. The nations reopened their land border and airspace to Qatar. 

On 27 March 2022, the Fourth High-Level Strategic Dialogue between the State of Qatar & the United Nations Office of Counter-Terrorism (UNOCT), it was revealed that the State of Qatar is the second largest contributor to the United Nations Trust Fund for Counter-Terrorism out of a total 35 other donors.

In May 2022, during his first visit to Europe after the Russian invasion of Ukraine, the Emir signed energy and investment projects with several countries, including Spain and Germany, and for the first time spoke at the World Economic Forum annual meeting in Davos.

India

Sheikh Tamim has maintained a strong relationship with the Indian government. On 25 March 2015, he visited India and met Prime Minister Narendra Modi. He said that the government "trusts" the Indian economy so they would invest in India. Last time Sheikh Tamim met with Indian Prime Minister Narendra Modi was on 23 September 2019, at the residence of the Permanent Mission of the State of Qatar to the United Nations, on the sidelines of the 74th session of the United Nations General Assembly in New York. Talks during the meeting dealt with the bilateral relations and ways of developing them in various aspects of cooperation, especially in the political and economic areas, to serve the interests of the two friendly people.

During the COVID-19 crisis, on 26 May 2020, Sheikh Tamim spoke on the phone with Prime Minister Narendra Modi. He said he appreciated the contributions made by the Indian community living in Qatar. In particular, he praised those working in the healthcare sector for their huge contribution during the present situation. In turn, Prime Minister Narendra Modi warmly appreciated the personal care taken by the Emir for ensuring the welfare of the Indian citizens in Qatar during the COVID-19 pandemic.

On 27 April 2021, Sheikh Tamim held a telephone conversation with Indian Prime Minister Modi and discussed ways to fight the novel COVID-19 pandemic. Sheikh Tamim immediately ordered to send urgent medical assistance to India.

Egypt
Qatar heavily invested in loans and aid to Egypt during the Muslim Brotherhood’s government. In August 2013, Qatar joined a U.S.-led attempt to mediate the escalating tension between the Muslim Brotherhood and the military. Speaking at Georgetown University during his first visit to the United States, Tamim reiterated that Qatar will not interfere in Egypt although he condemned what happened in Egypt after the 2013 coup. Since Mohamed Morsi’s removal from office, the new government has turned down Qatari offers for financial aid. Qatar's continued support for the Muslim Brotherhood resulted in a diplomatic rift between Doha and Saudi Arabia, Bahrain and the United Arab Emirates in 2014, culminating in the withdrawal of the latter three countries' ambassadors in March of that year. Qatar has continuously denied allegations of support for the Muslim Brotherhood, with the Foreign Minister stating in 2017: "In Egypt, when the Muslim Brotherhood assumed power, some linked this to Qatar's support, even though nearly 70 percent of the assistance program provided by Qatar was during the era of Essam Sharaf, during the period of the military council". In June 2016, former president of Egypt Mohamed Morsi was given a life sentence for accusations of passing state secrets to Qatar.

On 20 January 2021, Qatar and Egypt agreed to resume diplomatic relations. In March 2021, during a visit to Cairo, Qatari foreign minister Mohammed bin Abdulrahman bin Jassim Al Thani handed over Sheikh Tamim's invitation for Egypt's President Abdel Fattah el-Sisi. Sheikh Tamim named the Qatari ambassador to Egypt in July 2021 and met with el-Sisi in Baghdad on 28 August 2021. On 24 June 2022, Tamim met with el-Sisi in Cairo. They discussed diplomatic and economic relations after Qatar and Egypt had signed investments contracts worth more than US$5 billion in March 2022.

There have also been claims that Qatar supports the Muslim Brotherhood. Qatar allegedly provided a financial boost to Morsi's Freedom and Justice Party, and Brotherhood opponents allegedly argued that Morsi's narrow election victory was achieved through Qatari funding. After Morsi's election, Qatar contributed a total of US$5.5 billion to the  Muslim Brotherhood administration. Qatar has repeatedly denied that it supports the Muslim Brotherhood, saying it supports “the legitimate peoples and governments elected whatever the ideology of the ruling group as long as it works on the prosperity and welfare of its people.” Tamim himself has also repeatedly denied that Qatar supports extremists.

There have been rumors that Qatar looked at the Brotherhood in Syria as a natural Islamist ally to deliver its policy aims in the region. The Financial Times claimed in a report that Qatar provided Syrian rebels financial support of US$1 billion, saying that “people close to the Qatar government” claimed that the real amount is close to 3 billion dollars. Furthermore, there have been rumors that Qatar is using its funding to develop networks of loyalty among rebels and allegedly to set the stage for Qatar's influence in the post-Assad era, although these rumors are unconfirmed.

Some countries and regional analysts have claimed that Qatar has supported a spectrum of  Islamist groups around the region. Especially since the beginning of the Arab Spring upheaval in 2011, the country has provided diplomatic and medical initiatives, and warnings to Islamist groups. There have also been claims that the Qatar-based pan-Arab satellite television channel  Al Jazeera promoted the narratives of the Islamist parties and causes supported by Qatar, thereby contributing to the electoral success of some of these movements during national polls. However, Al Jazeera maintains that it was under pressure because “it is the most transparent, balanced and unbiased of all Arab channels". The channel previously hosted a talk-show, “al-Sharīʿa wa al-Ḥayāh” ("Shariah and Life"), featuring the controversial Brotherhood-associated Egyptian cleric Yusuf al-Qaradawi.

Analysts claim that both Qatar and Saudi Arabia are engaged in proxy wars in Syria and Libya.
Tamim in particular played a role in the mediation with Taliban leaders, with whom he initiated contacts under his father's government. The United States requested the establishment of a Taliban office in Doha. In June 2013, the Taliban opened their first official overseas office in the Qatari capital as part of the long-standing attempt to broker a long-term Afghan peace agreement. In June 2015, Qatar successfully mediated efforts to free four Tajikistan soldiers kidnapped in December 2014 in Afghanistan by a Taliban group.

Syria
Qatar called for a military intervention by Arab countries to end the bloodshed in Syria in 2012. Analysts expected that he would have been under immediate pressure to reduce Qatar's support for the rebels in the Syrian Civil War, which Tamim had previously supported. In fact, Sheikh Tamim took a step back after taking charge, primarily in response to the irritation voiced by Western powers at Qatar's operation to arm Syrian rebel groups which had been directed haphazardly. However, Qatar has continued to provide support to Syrian opposition groups, with Tamim declaring in a speech to the UN in September 2020 that Qatar would continue to support efforts to achieve justice and hold accountable perpetrators of atrocities, war crimes, and crimes against humanity in Syria. Recently, under the aegis of a joint initiative with Saudi Arabia and Turkey promoted by Sheikh Tamim, Qatar has provided Syrian rebels with new weapons and forged a new opposition coalition in Syria known as “Army of Conquest." The Sheikh has also renewed his country's support for the Syrian people's demands for justice and freedom during a meeting with the chief of the Syrian National Coalition Khaled Khoja and his delegation in April 2015.

Syrian rebel group Al-Rahman Legion is supported by Qatar. Since 2017, Qatari-backed Al-Rahman Legion has been fighting Saudi Arabian-backed Jaysh al-Islam rebel coalition.

Russia
On 13 October 2022, Tamin met with Russian President Vladimir Putin in the capital of Kazakhstan, Astana. He said he was "proud" of the relationship between Qatar and Russia.

Turkey
Tamim signed a military cooperation agreement with Turkey during an official visit to the country in December 2014. The agreement aims to promote cooperation in military training and the defense industry, and allows for the deployment of the Turkish Armed Forces to Qatar and the Qatari military to Turkey.

On 2 December 2015, Tamim signed a number of agreements with president Recep Tayyip Erdoğan. Cooperative agreements in education, maritime transport and correspondence pacts between intelligence agencies were signed. An agreement was also reached by Turkey to purchase liquefied natural gas from Qatar over a lengthy duration. The two leaders also announced the planned creation of a Turkish military base 
in Qatar; a first for Turkey in the Persian Gulf.

In August 2018, Qatar pledged $15 billion investment in Turkey, during currency crisis amid a diplomatic standoff with US. The investment package was announced after Qatar's Emir Tamim bin Hamad Al-Thani met President Erdoğan in Ankara, on 15 August 2018.

On 6 December 2021, Sheikh Tamim received President Erdogan for a state visit in Doha. During the two-day visit, they signed 15 agreements regarding culture, economy, defense and security. In addition, several Memoranda of Understanding were signed between the countries' ministries. Sheikh Tamim and President Erdogan also agreed to extend the $15 billion currency swap agreement between Qatar and Turkey.

United Kingdom 
In October 2014, Sheikh Tamim met UK Prime Minister David Cameron and Queen Elizabeth II on his first official visit to the UK. Qatar and the UK anticipated a Qatari-British Economic Forum to explore mutual investment opportunities. Up to and during this meeting The Telegraph newspaper launched a campaign to urge Cameron to discuss Qatar's funding of Islamic extremists with Tamim. Stephen Barclay, the Conservative MP, repeatedly called for transparency in Britain's dealings with Qatar and said it was "essential" for Mr Cameron to raise the issue of terror finance.  "I welcome the fact that the Prime Minister is meeting with the Emir," he said. "As part of these discussions it is essential that the issue of financing Sunni tribes in Syria and Iraq is raised.”

In July 2018, Sheikh Tamim and UK Prime Minister Theresa May signed a letter of intent between the governments of Qatar and the United Kingdom. Both agreed to exchange information and intelligence on terrorism, to cooperate in the areas of law enforcement related to terror activities and security of the transport sector, including airports and aviation, and to fight financial crime.

Al Udeid Air Base in Qatar houses the Royal Air Force's operational headquarters in the Middle East. It is host to the RAF's No. 83 Expeditionary Air Group. The group provides command and control to the four Expeditionary Air Wings which support Operation Kipion and Operation Shader.

The UK government has turned to Qatar to seek a long-term gas deal to ensure a stable supply of liquefied natural gas (LNG) to the UK. Prime Minister Johnson asked Tamim for help during a meeting at the UN General Assembly in September 2021.

Sheikh Tamim and Sheikha Jawaher attended the state funeral of Queen Elizabeth II at Westminster Abbey, London, on 19 September 2022.

France 
Tamim met French president François Hollande twice in 2014 and 2015. In the latter meeting, they signed an agreement for the sale of Rafale jets to Qatar.

Tamim met French president Emmanuel Macron twice in 2017. In the latter meeting, they signed commercial contracts worth more than US$14 billion. During their 2018 meeting, Tamim thanked Macron for his support for Qatar in the Gulf crisis. They met again in 2021.

United States

In July 2014, Tamim renewed the defence agreement with the U.S. and confirmed Qatar's cooperation with the U.S. in the Combined Air Operations Center (CAOC) at Al Udeid Air Base.

After visiting U.S. President Barack Obama at the White House in February 2015, Tamim wrote an editorial saying the U.S.-Qatari “strategic partnership has deepened in recent years, in spite of the regional unrest” and reiterated his commitment to support a more comprehensive approach to the strategic challenges facing the Middle East.

Sheikh Tamim has been a personal friend of U.S. President Donald Trump prior to the latter's presidency. He visited the United States several times during Trump's presidency and has held bilateral meetings at the White House in Washington, D.C.

In July 2017, the US and Qatar signed a memorandum of understanding to combat the financing of terrorism, making Qatar the first country in the region to sign the executive program with the United States to fight terrorism financing. Same year, then U.S. secretary of state Rex Tillerson stated that "The emir of Qatar has made progress in halting financial support and expelling terrorist elements from his country".

In July 2019, Sheikh Tamim visited the US to meet President Donald Trump and discuss the latest regional and international developments. A state dinner to welcome Tamim was organized at the White House with “who’s who of people in business”, including Robert Kraft and Christine Lagarde  The meeting concluded with an enhanced economic partnership between both the countries, with Qatar agreeing to do business with major US companies, including Boeing, Gulfstream, Raytheon and Chevron Phillips Chemical.

On 20 August 2021, Sheikh Tamim held a telephone conversation with U.S. President Joe Biden. Biden thanked Tamim for Qatar's support regarding the US evacuations from Afghanistan. According to Biden, the airlifts "would not have been possible without the early support from Qatar". Sheikh Tamim visited U.S. President Joe Biden at the White House on a visit to Washington, D.C. on 31 January 2022. He was the first leader from the Gulf Cooperation Council to visit the White House since Biden took office. They discussed bilateral relations, stability of global energy supplies, the situation in Afghanistan, and peace in the Middle East. Biden called Qatar a “good friend and reliable and capable partner”, and announced the designation of Qatar as a major non-NATO ally.

Qatar hosted the historic signing of a peace deal between the US and the Taliban in February 2020 which called for the full withdrawal of US troops from Afghanistan. Beginning in September 2020, Qatar has hosted the peace talks between the Afghan government and the Taliban to end decades of war in the country.

UAE 
In January 2019, a Reuters investigation revealed that a team of former US government intelligence operatives working on behalf of the United Arab Emirates had hacked the iPhones of activists, diplomats and foreign leaders, including Sheikh Tamim bin Hamad Al Thani. Beginning in 2016 the spying tool, code named ‘K4RM4’, enabled the UAE to monitor hundreds of individuals identified as potential critics of, or threats to, the Emirati government and its ideology. The hacking unit using the tool, known as ‘Project Raven’, was based in Abu Dhabi and composed of local security officials and former US intelligence operatives working for the UAE's intelligence services. Ex-Project Raven operatives described how Karma was able to remotely gain access to iPhones, including that of Sheikh Tamim's, by uploading numbers or email addresses into an automated targeting system. According to Reuters the phones of Sheikh Tamim's brother as well as several associates were also hacked by the Project Raven team.

Israel 
in 1996, Qatar established trade relations with the State of Israel, the first amongst all nations of the Arabian Peninsula and has continued to maintain its “working relationship” with Israel. But in 2021, Qatar abstained from entering diplomatic agreement with state of Israel brokered by the United States. It stated that it would normalize diplomatic ties when Israel commits to the Arab Peace Initiative. In May 2021, it was reported that Qatar had within a period of 10 years provided over $3 billion in aid to Gaza and West Bank with Israeli approval. In 2022, Israeli military officials were secretly dispatched to Qatar’s Al-Udeid air base, forward operating headquarters of all US forces in the Middle East, also known as CENTCOM as part of a security reshuffle. On 10 June 2022, FIFA announced that Israeli nationals would be allowed entry into Qatar during the World Cup tournament.

Personal characteristics and views
Sheikh Tamim is described as friendly, confident, and open by those who know him. He is also described as savvy, careful, and conservative. In addition, he is considered to be a pragmatist, and to have "excellent relations" with the West, including the United States and France.

Political analysts expected Tamim to be more conservative and risk-averse than his father. Because Tamim is very close to the Muslim Brotherhood, preserving a national identity grounded in Islamic traditional values has been Tamim's first priority.

Personal life

 Sheikh Tamim married his first wife and second cousin, Sheikha Jawaher bint Hamad Al Thani on 8 January 2005. They have four children, two sons and two daughters:
 Sheikha Al Mayassa bint Tamim bin Hamad Al Thani (born 15 January 2006)
 Sheikh Hamad bin Tamim bin Hamad Al Thani (born 20 October 2008).
 Sheikha Aisha bint Tamim bin Hamad Al Thani (born 24 August 2010).
 Sheikh Jassim bin Tamim bin Hamad Al Thani (born 12 June 2012).
 Sheikh Tamim married a second wife, Sheikha Al-Anoud bint Mana Al Hajri, on 3 March 2009. She is the daughter of Mana bin Abdul Hadi Al Hajri, former Qatari Ambassador to Jordan. They have five children, three daughters and two sons:
 Sheikha Naylah bint Tamim bin Hamad Al Thani (born 27 May 2010).
 Sheikh Abdullah bin Tamim bin Hamad Al Thani (born 29 September 2012).
 Sheikha Rodha bint Tamim bin Hamad Al Thani (born January 2014)
 Sheikh Alqaqaa bin Tamim bin Hamad Al Thani (born 3 October 2015)
Sheikha Moza bint Tamim bin Hamad Al Thani (born 19 May 2018).
 On 25 February 2014, Sheikh Tamim married a third wife, Sheikha Noora bint Hathal Al Dosari. They have four children, three sons and one daughter:
 Sheikh Joaan bin Tamim bin Hamad Al Thani (born 27 March 2015).
 Sheikh Mohammed bin Tamim bin Hamad Al Thani (born 17 July 2017)
 Sheikh Fahad bin Tamim bin Hamad Al Thani (born 16 June 2018)
 Sheikha Hind bint Tamim bin Hamad Al Thani (born 5 February 2020)

In total he has thirteen children born between 2006 and 2020; seven sons and six daughters, from three wives.

Tamim participates in competitive sport. He was filmed playing badminton and bowled with former Egyptian military chief Mohamed Hussein Tantawi. He has a strong interest in history and his nation's heritage. He is fluent in Arabic, English and French.

Public image
A sketch of Tamim entitled Tamim al-Majd (Tamim the Glorious) by advertiser Ahmed al-Maadheed became extremely popular as a nationalistic symbol in Qatar following the beginning of the 2017 Qatar diplomatic crisis.

Honours
National
 :
 Grand Master of the Order of Independence (25 June 2013).
 Grand Master of the Order of Merit (25 June 2013; Collar 5 August 2003).
Foreign
 : Member Exceptional Class of the Order of Sheikh Isa bin Salman Al Khalifa (23 February 2004).
 : Collar of the Order of the Southern Cross (12 November 2021).
 : National Order of Chad (13 August 2022).
 : Grand Order of King Tomislav (23 April 2017).
 : Grand Collar of the National Order of Merit (30 October 2018).
 : Grand Officer of the Order of the Legion of Honour (4 February 2010).
 : Knight Grand Cross of the Order of Merit of the Italian Republic (16 November 2007).
 : Collar of the Order of Mubarak the Great (28 October 2013).
 : Civil First Class of the Order of Oman (22 November 2021).
 : Recipient of the Nishan-e-Pakistan (23 June 2019).
 : Grand Cross of the Order of the Sun of Peru (13 February 2014).
 : Member First Class of the Order of Nila Utama (16 March 2009).
 : Collar of the Order of Isabella the Catholic (10 May 2022).
 : Recipient of the Chain of Honour (2 April 2014).
 : Grand Cordon of the Order of the Republic (3 April 2014).
 : Collar of the Order of Zayed (6 January 2005).

Awards
 
 Al-Ahram Newspaper: "Best Sport Personality in the Arab World" - 2006.
 
 Olympic Council of Asia: Recipient of the "OCA Award of Merit" - 2007.

References

External links

1980 births
Emirs of Qatar
People educated at Harrow School
Graduates of the Royal Military Academy Sandhurst
Tamim bin Hamad Al Thani
International Olympic Committee members
Living people
People educated at Sherborne School
People from Doha
Qatari politicians
Qatari Muslims

Grand Officiers of the Légion d'honneur
Knights Grand Cross with Collar of the Order of Merit of the Italian Republic
Recipients of the Darjah Utama Nila Utama
Qatari billionaires
People named in the Pandora Papers
Foreign recipients of the Nishan-e-Pakistan
Collars of the Order of Isabella the Catholic
Recipients of orders, decorations, and medals of Sudan